= Picharagardha =

- village
- Country: India
- State: Andhra Pradesh

Government
  - Body: Village Panchayat

Languages
  - Official: Telugu
- Time zone: UTC+5:30 (IST)
- Nearest city: Hyderabad
- Civic agency: Village Panchayat

Picharagardha is a farming village in Ranga Reddy district, the state of Telangana, India. It is home to around five hundred families growing ginger, watermelon and wheat.
